Country Joe was the seventh album of Country Joe McDonald, released in 1975. It was reissued on CD in 1996 on the One Way Records label.

Track listing
All tracks composed by Joe McDonald; except where indicated
 "Dr. Hip" – 3:46
 "Old Joe Corey" – 3:05
 "Making Money in Chile" – 3:11
 "You Messed over Me" – 5:02
 "Memories" – 6:50
 "Chile" – 4:33
 "Pleasin'" – 4:12
 "Jesse James" (Barry Melton, Robert Hunter) – 3:49
 "Satisfactory" – 4:09
 "It's Finally Over" – 2:54

Personnel
 Country Joe McDonald – vocals, guitar, kazoo, harmonica
 Charlie Brown – electric guitar
 Sam T. Brown – guitar
 Sal DiTroia – guitar
 Gary Chester – drums
 Frank Owens – piano
 Joe Macho – bass
Gail Nelson, Hilda Harris, Maeretha Stewart - backing vocals
George Butcher - string and horn arrangements
Technical
David Baker, Jeff Zaraya - engineer
Steve Prezant - photography

References

1975 albums
Country Joe McDonald albums
Albums produced by Maynard Solomon
Vanguard Records albums